Martin Matupi (born 26 November 1942) is a Malawian former triple jumper.

Competing in the men's triple jump at the 1972 Summer Olympics in Munich, he finished in 34th place with a distance of 13.57 metres. Matupi was the Malawian flag carrier in the opening ceremony at the Games.

References

1942 births
Living people
Malawian triple jumpers
Malawian male athletes
Male triple jumpers
Olympic athletes of Malawi
Athletes (track and field) at the 1972 Summer Olympics